Michael Terry McDermott (died April 15, 2013) - better known as Michael Tarry - was a popular singer in Canada in the 1970s.

Born in Manchester, England, McDermott moved to Canada in 1958. He was a member of two groups: "Susan Taylor and the Paytons", and "Milestone". In 1969, he signed with Columbia Records. As Michael Tarry, he was best known for his 1973 hit "Rosalie".

McDermott died on April 15, 2013.

Singles
All That I Love (1968) Columbia C4-2848 (#92 CAN)  (#5 CanCon) 
If You Believe (1969) Columbia C4-2863 (#7 CanCon) 
Neighbours At The Zoo / A Dime's Worth (1969) Columbia C4-2877 
What's Your Name? / The Earth Ran Away With The Moon (1969) Columbia C4-2878
Sometimes You're Up  (1970) Columbia C4-2922
Rosalie (1973) WEA Records (#8 CAN) Reprise CR4017  (#39 CanCountry)  (#6 CanAC) 
Forgotten Man (1973) Reprise CR4020 (#52 CanAC) 
Memories (1974) Reprise CR4024 (#13 CanAC)

Albums
Michael Tarry (1973) Reprise RSC 8007 (#87 Can)

References

External links
Entry at Discogs.com

Entry at 45cat.com

Canadian male singers
British male singers
British pop singers
Year of birth missing
2013 deaths